Bring It On is the second studio album released by American country music artist Keith Harling. Released in 1999, it is also his final studio album. Only two singles were released from it: the title track and "Santa's Got a Semi", neither of which charted in the Top 40 on the country charts. "Honey Do" was later released as a single by Mike Walker from his self-titled debut album, and "Four Walls" by Randy Travis on his album Passing Through.

Track listing
"Bring It On" (Rivers Rutherford, George Teren) – 4:21
"Honey Do" (Kent Blazy, Al Anderson, Jeffrey Steele) – 3:22
"Over You" (Skip Ewing, Donny Kees) – 3:42
"Love Without Question" (Doug Johnson, Tony Martin) – 3:35
"As If" (Ewing, Steve Diamond) – 4:21
"Easy Makin' Love" (Rutherford, Annie Tate, Sam Tate) – 3:31
"It Goes Something Like This" (Anderson, Bob DiPiero, Craig Wiseman) – 2:57
"Harmless Heart" (Kim Patton-Johnston, Liz Rose) – 3:18
"Heartaches and Honky Tonks" (Leslie Satcher, Don Poythress, Luke Wooten) – 2:49
"Four Walls" (Don Rollins, Harry Stinson, D. Vincent Williams) – 4:25
"Santa's Got a Semi" (Pat Bunch, Johnson) – 3:02

Personnel
 Bruce Bouton – steel guitar
 John Catchings – cello
 Joe Chemay – bass guitar
 David Davidson – violin
 Larry Franklin – fiddle
 Paul Franklin – lap steel guitar, pedal steel guitar
 Steve Gibson – acoustic guitar, bass guitar, six-string bass guitar
 Jackie Harling – background vocals
 Keith Harling – lead vocals
 Wes Hightower – background vocals
 John Hobbs – piano, Hammond organ, keyboards
 Paul Leim – drums, percussion
 Brent Mason – electric guitar
 Terry McMillan – harmonica
 Russ Pahl – Dobro, autoharp
 Tom Roady – percussion
 Brent Rowan – acoustic guitar, electric guitar, mandolin
 Biff Watson – acoustic guitar
 Kris Wilkinson – viola, conductor, string arrangements
 Dennis Wilson – background vocals

References
[ Bring It On] at Allmusic

1999 albums
Giant Records (Warner) albums
Keith Harling albums
Albums produced by Doug Johnson (record producer)